Tepito is a station of the Metro B line located north of the center of México City in the barrio Tepito in the Colonia Morelos district of the Cuauhtémoc delegation.  The station's logo represents a boxing glove. Many Mexican boxers were born and raised in Tepito, like Rubén Olivares "El Púas" ("spikes"). Today, Tepito is an infamous zone in Mexico City, due to the high level of drug trafficking, counterfeiting, and violent crime.

The station was opened on 15 December 1999.

From 23 April to 28 June 2020, the station was temporarily closed due to the COVID-19 pandemic in Mexico.

Ridership

References

External links 

Tepito
Railway stations opened in 1999
1999 establishments in Mexico
Mexico City Metro stations in Cuauhtémoc, Mexico City
Accessible Mexico City Metro stations